The 2017–18 Kent State Golden Flashes men's basketball team represented Kent State University during the 2017–18 NCAA Division I men's basketball season. The Golden Flashes, led by seventh-year head coach Rob Senderoff, played their home games at the Memorial Athletic and Convocation Center, also known as the MAC Center, as members of the East Division of the Mid-American Conference. They finished the season 17–17, 9–9 in MAC play to finish in second place in the MAC East division. They defeated Northern Illinois and Ball State in the MAC tournament before losing to Buffalo in the semifinals.

Previous season
The Golden Flashes finished the 2016–17 season 22–14, 10–8 in MAC play to finish fourth in the MAC East division. As the No. 6 seed in the MAC tournament, the Flashes defeated Central Michigan, Buffalo, Ohio, and Akron to win the tournament for the first time since 2008. As a result, the Flashes received the conference's automatic bid to the NCAA tournament as the No. 14 seed in the South region. In the First Round, they lost to UCLA.

Offseason

2017 recruiting class

Schedule and results

|-
!colspan=9 style=| Exhibition

|-
!colspan=9 style=| Non-conference regular season

|-
!colspan=9 style=| MAC regular season

|-
!colspan=9 style=| MAC tournament

See also
 2017–18 Kent State Golden Flashes women's basketball team

References

Kent State
Kent State Golden Flashes men's basketball seasons
Kent State
Kent State